The Northwest Division is one of the three divisions in the Western Conference of the National Basketball Association (NBA). The division consists of five teams: the Denver Nuggets, the Minnesota Timberwolves, the Oklahoma City Thunder, the Portland Trail Blazers and the Utah Jazz. The Northwest Division is by far the most geographically expansive of the six divisions; the Nuggets, Trail Blazers and Jazz are geographically closer to the Pacific Division, the Timberwolves are geographically closer to the Central Division, and the Thunder is geographically closer to the Southwest Division, although in the latter instance that was not the case when the division was formed as the Thunder were still the Seattle SuperSonics.

The division was created at the start of the 2004–05 season, when the league expanded from 29 to 30 teams with the addition of the Charlotte Bobcats. The league realigned itself into three divisions in each conference. The Northwest Division began with five inaugural members: the Nuggets, the Timberwolves, the Trail Blazers, the SuperSonics and the Jazz. The Trail Blazers and SuperSonics joined from the Pacific Division, while the Nuggets, the Timberwolves and Jazz joined from the now-defunct Midwest Division. The SuperSonics moved to Oklahoma City prior to the 2008–09 season and became the Thunder, but remained in the Northwest Division. Other than this franchise re-location, the division's membership has remained unchanged since its creation.

The most recent division champions are the Utah Jazz, having won a fifth division championship in the 2021–22 NBA season. The SuperSonics-Thunder franchise has won the most Northwest Division titles, with six, while the Nuggets and Jazz have each won five, the Trail Blazers have won two, and the Timberwolves have never won the Northwest Division title. In the 2009–10 season, all four teams that qualified for the playoffs each had more than 50 wins, and in 2018–19 all four teams that qualified for the playoffs had at least 49 wins.

Since the 2021–22 season, the Northwest Division champions has received the Sam Jones Trophy, named after Hall of Famer Sam Jones.

Current standings

Teams

Sam Jones Trophy
Beginning with the 2021–22 season, the Northwest Division champions has received the Sam Jones Trophy. As with the other division championship trophies, it is named after one of the African American pioneers from NBA history. During his playing career from 1957 to 1969, Sam Jones was an integral part of a Boston Celtics dynasty that won 10 NBA championships during that span. The Jones Trophy consists of a  crystal ball.

Division champions

Titles by team

Season results

Notes
 Because of a lockout, the season did not start until December 25, 2011, and all 30 teams played a shortened 66-game regular season schedule.
 Due to the COVID-19 pandemic, the 82-game regular season schedule was suspended on March 11, 2020. The season was restarted on July 30 under an eight-game seeding format in the 2020 NBA Bubble to conclude the regular season and determine playoff berths. Games were played inside the ESPN Wide World of Sports Complex at Walt Disney World in Orlando, Florida.
 Due to the COVID-19 pandemic, the season did not start until December 22, 2020, and all 30 teams played a shortened 72-game regular season schedule.

References
General

 

Specific

External links
 NBA.com Team Index

Western Conference (NBA)
National Basketball Association divisions
Denver Nuggets
Minnesota Timberwolves
Oklahoma City Thunder
Portland Trail Blazers
Seattle SuperSonics
Utah Jazz
Sports in the Western United States